The Fire and Rescue Services Association (FRSA) is a British trade union representing all fire service staff employed under grey or green book terms and conditions 

The Association was founded in 1976, as the Retained Firefighters' Union (RFU) and changed its name to "The Fire and Rescue Services Association"(FRSA)in 2018. 

The FRSA is a member led organisation committed to protecting and modernising the terms and conditions , health & well being support and working practices within the Fire and Rescue Service. 

The FRSA has a no strike constitution , FRSA members will not put their communities at risk, and they prefer the power of argument rather than the argument of power.

General Secretaries / Chief Executive Officer  
1976: Don Bates      General Secretary 
1997: Derek Chadbon  General Secretary 
2007: John Barton    General Secretary 
2015: Tristan Ashby. Chief  Executive Officer

Footnotes

External links 

Trade unions in the United Kingdom
Firefighters associations
Trade unions based in Norfolk
Trade unions established in 1976